Lexington County School District Three (LCSD3), also known as Batesburg-Leesville Schools, is a school district headquartered in Batesburg-Leesville, South Carolina.

It operates four schools: Batesburg-Leesville Primary School, Batesburg-Leesville Elementary School, Batesburg-Leesville Middle School, and Batesburg-Leesville High School. It also operates the First Steps and Lifelong Learning Centers as well as a Fine Arts Center.

References

External links
 
School districts in South Carolina
Education in Lexington County, South Carolina